Rays, originally called Ray's Tent City and then, Ray's Outdoors, was an Australian chain of retail stores in 40 locations across Australia, selling camping, hiking and kayaking equipment, as well as outdoor clothing and footwear.

It was founded in Geelong in 1958 by Ray Frost, as a single camping and army disposals store. The chain was acquired by the Super Retail Group in 2010, which said 12 of the 38 former Ray's Outdoors outlets would be re-branded as BCF (Boating Camping and Fishing) stores, an existing Super Retail Group business, and 15 would be converted to a new Rays brand.

Beginning in about April 2018, several Rays stores were closed, with the profitable ones becoming Macpac Adventure Hubs, using the name of the New Zealand chain recently acquired by the Super Retail Group. Unlike Macpac stores, Adventure Hubs stocked brands Ray's Outdoors was renowned for selling. They combined the Macpac range of technical outdoor gear, with a selection of apparel, equipment and accessories from some of the world's leading brands: Patagonia, Columbia, Keen, SeaToSummit, Yeti, Scarpa, Coleman, Weber and Wanderer.

References

External links
 

Sporting goods retailers of Australia
Super Retail Group
Defunct retail companies of Australia